Alfred Tinkler (22 August 1886 – 2 April 1950) was an English professional footballer who played as a centre half in the Football League for Derby County and Birmingham.

Tinkler was born in Manchester in 1886. He played football for Ilkeston United before joining Derby County in 1909, but made only two League appearances before returning to non-league football with Heanor United and a second spell at Ilkeston. Between 1911 and 1915 when competitive football was postponed for the duration of the First World War, Tinkler made more than 100 appearances in all competitions for Second Division club Birmingham.

Tinkler later resided in Wallington, Surrey. He died at St James' Hospital, Balham, in 1950 at the age of 63.

References

1886 births
1950 deaths
Footballers from Manchester
English footballers
Association football midfielders
Ilkeston United F.C. players
Derby County F.C. players
Heanor United F.C. players
Birmingham City F.C. players
Burton United F.C. players
English Football League players